Nathaniel Hone the Younger (26 October 1831 – 14 October 1917) was an Irish painter, the great-grand-nephew of the painter Nathaniel Hone.

Life and career 

Hone studied at Trinity College Dublin. He began his career as a railway engineer but gave this up to study art in Paris. Most of his later paintings are landscapes, very often enlivened with animals and occasionally with figures. He was a member of the Hone family. In France he was influenced by the painter Gustave Courbet who was taking a new and quite revolutionary realistic approach. His closest painting tips were, however, from another French impressionist, Camille Corot. Hone became a close friend of one of Corot's followers at the Barbizon School of landscape painting. At Barbizon he learned to appreciate colour, texture and tone in the landscape, and applied it in strong and confident brushworks to the painting of Irish subjects on his return.  In Paris, Hone worked closely with artist Édouard Brandon, also a follower of Corot's, and stayed with him at 44, rue du Notre Dame de Lorette.

Hone established Malahide Golf Club in 1892 and is now one of Dublin's premier golf courses and restaurants.

Work

Hone's paintings which were completed in France have many similarities to those that he worked on to his country farm in Co. Dublin, but the finish is perhaps more polished and professional in the later Irish works. One of his finest pieces is Pastures at Malahide (pictured). Cows in the foreground of the painting rest quietly grazing against the low horizon. This allows for a large amount of space to be given to the rich and dominating sky full of white cumulus clouds. The atmosphere is one of peace and tranquility, while being typically Irish with the feeling of impending rain.

See also
 List of Orientalist artists
 Orientalism

References

External links
Nathaniel Hone Paintings & Bio
Census Return, Irish Census 1911
1872 Marriage

1831 births
1917 deaths
19th-century Irish painters
20th-century Irish painters
Irish male painters
Irish people of Dutch descent
Burials at St. Andrew's Church, Graveyard, Malahide
Orientalist painters
19th-century Irish male artists
20th-century Irish male artists